Tommy St. Jago (born 3 January 2000) is a Dutch professional football player who plays as a centre back for Dutch Eredivisie club FC Utrecht.

Club career
He made his Eerste Divisie debut for Jong FC Utrecht on 1 April 2019 in a game against Roda JC Kerkrade, as an 8th-minute substitute for Redouan El Yaakoubi.

International career
Born in the Netherlands, St. Jago is of Indonesian, Dutch and Curaçao descent. He is a youth international for the Netherlands.

References

External links
 
 

2000 births
Living people
Footballers from Utrecht (city)
Dutch footballers
Netherlands youth international footballers
Dutch people of Indonesian descent
Dutch people of Curaçao descent
Association football defenders
FC Utrecht players
Jong FC Utrecht players
Eerste Divisie players
Eredivisie players